Gamepad is a British television show, that originally aired on Bravo from 2001 to 2004. It is hosted by Violet Berlin.

The show distinguished itself from rival video games shows by professing to be "by gamers, for gamers". Systems covered included Microsoft Windows and Mac OS, the PlayStation 2, GameCube and the Xbox.

It was replaced in 2004 by a new show called When Games Attack. It was hosted by Dominik Diamond, the person who previously hosted GamesMaster for Channel 4.

References

External links 
 News: Gamepad 3

2001 British television series debuts
2004 British television series endings
Bravo (British TV channel) original programming
Television shows about video games